"March On! (You Fighting Sycamores)" is the official school fight song of Indiana State University. The song and lyrics were written by ISU professor of music Joseph A. Gremelspacher as a pep song.

"March On!" was first performed at a Homecoming pep rally on October 20, 1939. "March On!" replaced "Cheer for the Blue and White" as the school's primary fight song.

"March On!" is performed by the "Blue Thunder" basketball band at every home basketball game, and by the Pride of Indiana at every home football game. When Indiana State wins, the band alters the fight song to have a waltz feel, which is known as "Waltz On!".

Lyrics

See also 
Cheer for the Blue and White - Former fight song, current school song

References 

American college songs
College fight songs in the United States
Missouri Valley Conference fight songs
Indiana State University